Randall E. Burden Jr. (born February 6, 1989) is an American football cornerback who is currently a free agent.

College career
He played college football at the University of Kentucky.

Professional career

Missouri Monsters
On March 11, 2013, Burden signed with the Missouri Monsters of the Ultimate Indoor Football League (UIFL).

Tampa Bay Storm
Burden was assigned to the Tampa Bay Storm.

Spokane Empire
On September 10, 2015, Burden was signed by the Spokane Empire of the Indoor Football League. he was released on April 12, 2016.

Florida Tarpons
Following his release from Spokane, Burden signed with the Florida Tarpons of American Indoor Football.

References

External links
Kentucky Wildcats bio

Living people
American football cornerbacks
Kentucky Wildcats football players
Missouri Monsters players
Tampa Bay Storm players
Spokane Empire players
Florida Tarpons players
People from LaGrange, Georgia
Players of American football from Georgia (U.S. state)
1989 births